Perspective is an episodic drama film from Canada written and directed by B. P. Paquette and starring Stéphane Paquette, Patricia Tedford, and Pandora Topp in a love triangle. The film is divided into nine chapters, shot over nine years, that span nine years in the lives of three characters named “Alex”. The nine chapters, titled, respectively, Chapter 1: Salt & Soda (2012), Chapter 2: Chris and Other Beards (2013), Chapter 3: Hush, hsuH (2014), Chapter 4: Reflecting (2015), Chapter 5: Triangulation (2016), Chapter 6: The Saddest Lines (2017), Chapter 7: Me, Myself, and I (2018), Chapter 8: Marital Accumulation (2019), and Chapter 9: The Shed of Theseus (2020) have been completed and presented exclusively at Cinéfest Sudbury International Film Festival as of 2020.

Production history
Subtitled Variations on a Love Triangle in 9 Chapters, Perspective is unique in that it is a feature-length fiction film that started in 2012, and continued to evolve until its completion in 2020. Every year a new chapter of the film was presented exclusively at Cinéfest until the project was complete. Each chapter runs approximately 15 to 30 minutes, with the completed film running 179 minutes. The time-lapse between chapters is integrated into the narrative. At the premiere of each additional chapter, the preceding chapters were replayed.

Shot and set in Northern Ontario, the film features music and sound design (the onscreen credit states "soundscapes") by Daniel Bédard, picture editing by Ernest Riffe, and cinematography by Ivan Gekoff.

B. P. Paquette employed Perspective as a teaching tool for his film production students in the Motion Picture Arts program at Thorneloe University. "It was to encourage the students that they don't need millions of dollars, big movie stars and huge crews to make a feature-length film," said Paquette.

Casting
In each chapter of the film, the three actors rotate which roles they play. According to Paquette, “We’re not letting the audience identify a character with an actor... So, at all times, all of the actors are all of the characters.”

Chapters
The film features only three performers who each play, at various points, each of the three characters named "Alex". Within the narrative, each chapter occurs months to a year apart from the proceeding chapter, and the duration of each chapter is between 15–30 minutes.

Release
Each of the nine chapters that compose Perspective has premiered at Cinefest in, respectively, 2012, 2013, 2014, 2015, 2016, 2017, 2018, 2019, and 2020.

See also
List of films shot over three or more years
 Antoine Doinel – In five films, French filmmaker François Truffaut followed the fictional life of Antoine Doinel (played by Jean-Pierre Léaud) - beginning in 1959, with following films for 1962, 1968, 1970 and 1979. 
 Up series – a series of documentary films that have followed the lives of fourteen British children since 1964, when they were seven years old.
 That Obscure Object of Desire – Luis Buñuel's last film is now considered by many to be a masterpiece wherein two actresses play the same character interchangeably.
 Palindromes – Heavily criticized upon release, especially for director Todd Solondz's decision to cast eight actors as his lead character.

References

Film series introduced in 2012
2010s drama films
2020s drama films
Canadian drama films
English-language Canadian films
Films directed by B. P. Paquette
2010s English-language films
2020s English-language films
2010s Canadian films